Matteo Lovatti the younger (Rome, 1861  –  1927) was an Italian painter, mainly of genre subjects.

Biography
His grandfather, with the same name (1769-1849) was an architect, who worked for the Papal authorities during the early 19th century. His father Filippo Lovatti was a lawyer and he died in 1893. Matteo was influenced by the circle of realist genre painters around Mariano Fortuny in Rome. He exhibited in 1880 at Turin: Il 14 marzo 1878 a Roma; the same year at Milan, Piccolo venditore di violette; in 1883 at Rome, Vita moderna; in 1884 at Turin, Una partita alle carte and Male Portrait. In 1909, he exhibited with the Watercolor Association in Rome: Il Vaticano and Villa de' Quintili.

References

External links 
The day of the Royal Derby in Rome, ottocento.it

The life of Matteo Lovatti junior, lovatti.eu

19th-century Italian painters
Italian male painters
20th-century Italian painters
20th-century Italian male artists
1861 births
Italian genre painters
Year of death missing
19th-century Italian male artists